Simplicia extinctalis is a litter moth of the  family Erebidae. It is found in most countries of subtropical Africa, from Sierra Leone to Somalia and from Ethiopia to South Africa, including some islands of the Atlantic Ocean and Indian Ocean, as well as in Yemen.

References

Herminiinae
Moths described in 1852
Moths of Cape Verde
Moths of the Comoros
Moths of Africa
Moths of Madagascar
Moths of Mauritius
Moths of Seychelles
Moths of the Middle East